SMWS may refer to:

 Sydney Metropolitan Wildlife Service
 The Scotch Malt Whisky Society